Montgomery Creek is a stream in the U.S. state of Iowa.

Montgomery Creek was named after J. B. Montgomery, a local minister who almost drowned while crossing the swollen creek.

References

Rivers of Iowa
Rivers of Boone County, Iowa